Reptile is the fourteenth solo studio album by Eric Clapton. The album was produced by Eric Clapton with Simon Climie and is Clapton's first album to include keyboard work by Billy Preston and background vocals by the Impressions. The album reached the Top 10 in 20 countries, topping the national album charts in three of them. In total, the album sold more than 2.5 million copies and gained several certification awards around the globe. To help promote album sales, music network VH1 streamed the album in full on TV.

Clapton presented the album on his Reptile World Tour in 2001.

Critical reception

Rolling Stone'''s Anthony DeCurtis thought Clapton combines both blues and pop music very well and "blends virtually every style he's worked in during the past thirty-five years". PopMatters critic Simon Warner felt the album "could have been mawkish but it's actually quite moving. Clapton, circumspect as a composer and still highly adept as a musical practitioner, has his own authentic blues to draw on now and, in many ways, they hit a truer note than when he dips into the older, existing catalogue of standards. Reptile may be an uneven collection, but its best moments stand close listening". Christa L. Titus from Billboard magazine calls the album a perfect example for Clapton's typical "heritage rock format". William Ruhlmann in his AllMusic review sums up Clapton's history as a rock guitar player and rock god in the early stages of his musical career, then describes the dedication and album artwork of Reptile.

Track listing

 Personnel 
Take from the album's liner notes.

 Eric Clapton – guitar, vocals (2-13, 15)
 Doyle Bramhall II – guitar (2-9, 11-15)
 Andy Fairweather Low – guitar (2-9, 11-15)
 Paul Carrack – keyboards (1), Hammond organ (10), Wurlitzer electric piano (10)
 Billy Preston – Hammond organ (2, 5, 13), acoustic piano (6, 9), harmonica (14)
 Tim Carmon – Hammond organ (3, 4, 7-9, 11), acoustic piano (5, 13), synthesizer (12, 14), organ (15)
 Joe Sample – Wurlitzer electric piano (3, 6), Fender Rhodes (4), electric piano (8, 11, 14), acoustic piano (11, 14, 15)
 Pino Palladino – bass guitar (1, 10)
 Nathan East – bass guitar (2-9, 11-15)
 Steve Gadd – drums
 Paul Waller – drum programming (1, 3, 4, 6, 8, 10, 11, 13)
 Paulinho da Costa – percussion (1, 3-9, 11, 13, 15)
 Nick Ingman – string arrangements (6, 11, 12, 14)
 The Impressions – backing vocals (2-5, 7-13)

 Production 
 Eric Clapton – producer, album sleeve concept, liner notes
 Simon Climie – producer, Pro Tools engineer
 Alan Douglas – engineer
 Adam Brown – additional engineer, additional Pro Tools engineer 
 Pete Karam – additional engineer
 Paul Walton – additional ProTools engineer 
 Tom Sweeney – assistant engineer
 Matt Fields – assistant engineer
 Mick Guzauski – mixing
 Bob Ludwig – mastering at Gateway Mastering (Portland, Maine).
 Lee Dickson – guitar technician 
 Paul Miggens – lettering
 Catherine Roylance – design
 Jack English – photography
 Bushbranch – management

Commercial success

America, Asia and Oceania
In the United States, Reptile peaked at number five on the Billboard 200 top albums chart, gaining a so-called "Hot Shot Debut" recognition by the American magazine, as the album sold a total of 101,500 units in its first week. In addition to its success on the main albums chart, compiled by Billboard, the 2001 release also topped the magazines top Internet albums chart for several weeks. In the first quarter of 2001, Reptile sold more than 215,000 copies in the United States alone. On 8 June, the rock album was certified with a Gold disc by the Recording Industry Association of America (RIAA) to commemorate outstanding sales figures reaching more than 500,000 copies. In total, the album stayed sixteen weeks on the Billboard 200 chart and sold more than 700,000 copies by the end of 2001 in the United States, making it that years 184th most purchased album. In Canada, Clapton's 2001 release went to number 11 on Billboards top Canadian albums chart in 2001. In Japan, the release was even more successful, reaching position six on Oricons album chart in 2001. In New Zealand, Reptile peaked at number 15. However, in Australia, the Clapton album reached number 20 on the ARIA charts in 2001, and was certified Platinum for sales exceeding 70,000 copies in the country.

EuropeReptile was a big success in Europe, topping three album charts in the continent, reaching the Top 10 in 16 countries and gaining a total of 13 certification awards for outstanding record sales. In Austria, the album peaked at number two on the albums chart in 2001. In Belgium, the release peaked at number ten in Flanders and number 13 in Wallonia. In the Czech Republic, the release topped the nations album chart. In Denmark, the album reached position seven on the Hitlisten chart in 2001. In the Netherlands, Reptile reached number nine on the MegaCharts album compilation. Reptile also reached number five on Finland's Suomen virallinen lista albums chart. In France, the album peaked at number nine on the album charts, compiled by the Syndicat National de l'Édition Phonographique (SNEP) in 2001. In Germany, the album peaked at number two on the albums chart, and was certified, Gold by the Bundesverband Musikindustrie (BVMI), selling more than 150,000 copies in the country. In Greece, Hungary and Ireland, the album reached positions one, 13 and 25 in 2001. Reptile was a hit album in Italy, as it peaked at number eight in the country. In Norway, Reptile reached number seven on the VG-lista chart. In Poland, the Clapton album reached number four on the country's albums chart in 2001. In Portugal, Reptile reached number five on the nations album chart in 2001. In Spain, the album reached number five on the albums chart, and was certified Gold by the Productores de Música de España (PROMUSICAE) for outstanding sales figures, reaching 50,000 sold copies. In Sweden, the album reached number nine on the Sverigetopplistan albums chart in 2001. Reptile'' was also certified Gold in Switzerland by the local IFPI office, previously peaking at number two on the Schweizer Hitparade. In the United Kingdom, the album peaked at number seven on the charts compiled by the Official Charts Company, where it stayed for nine weeks on chart. It was certified Gold by the British Phonographic Industry (BPI). In Scotland, the album peaked at number 22. Overall, the album reached number two on the European albums chart in 2001.

Chart positions

Weekly charts

Year-end charts

Certifications

References

Eric Clapton albums
2001 albums
Reprise Records albums
Albums produced by Simon Climie
Albums recorded at Olympic Sound Studios
Albums recorded at MSR Studios
Albums recorded at United Western Recorders